Patrick Jurdić (also known as Patrick Jurdič & Patrick Jurdic) (born 14 December 1985 in Vienna, Austria) is an Austro-Croatian singer who rose to popularity after winning Hrvatski Idol 2, the Croatian version of Pop Idol, shown by Nova TV. Additionally, he also took part in Austria's casting show Starmania and reached the top-12. One of the songs from his album "Reci Da Si Za", called "The Party", written by Gordon Pogoda, Johnny Elkins, Cutfather & Joe, was released as a single and video.

Patrick was the second only Idol to previously appear on another Idol series' performance show, he reached the Top 40 of Česko hledá SuperStar singing Robbie Williams' song "Angels" (incidentally he sang this song again on the night of his Hrvatski Idol victory), he was also criticised for not being fluent in Czech and was told to read a list of terms such as Strč prst skrz krk. He only gained 5% (36,203) of the total votes that week.

Hrvatski Idol Performances
Semi Finals: "Bridge Over Troubled Water" by Simon & Garfunkel
Top 8: "Wake Me Up Before You Go-Go" by Wham!
Top 7: "Daj Ugasi Žeđ" by Giuliano
Top 6: "Rock Me Amadeus" by Falco
Top 5: "I Believe I Can Fly" by R. Kelly
Top 4: "Would I Lie To You?" by Charles & Eddie
Top 3: "Nema Razloga" by Jacques Houdek
Top 3: "Amazing" by George Michael
Grand Final: "Moj Broj"
Grand Final: "Džuli" by Daniel Popović
Grand Final: "Angels" by Robbie Williams

Discography
Albums
Reci Da Si Za (July 2006)

Singles
"Pull Me Out From Inside" (July 2006)
"Moj Broj"
"Samo Reci Da"

External links
http://www.patrickjurdic.com Official Site
http://www.statelinemusic.com Composers of More than just a Crush (Samo Reci Da) and Dreaming about you

1985 births
Living people
21st-century Austrian male singers
English-language singers from Austria
Austrian people of Croatian descent
Idols (TV series) winners
Starmania participants